Maktab Rendah Sains MARA Terendak (commonly known as MRSM Terendak) is a member school of a group of co-educational boarding schools known as MRSM (abbreviation of ) or alternatively known as MARA Junior Science College or MJSC. It is in Terendak Camp, Malacca in Malaysia. The school is on a 19-acre area in Terendak Camp which is the largest military camp in Malaysia. MRSM Terendak can accommodate up to 700 students from the age of 13 (Form 1) to 17 (Form 5).

History

Establishment
MRSM Terendak was established in cooperation between Majlis Amanah Rakyat (MARA) and the Ministry of Defence. It shares the same vision and mission of MRSM but with a priority towards enrolling selected children from the military families.

The school began its operation in July 1983 with a total of 300 students, including students from MRSM Balik Pulau, Pulau Pinang. The first registration of MRSM Terendak students took place on July 23, 1983. In the first year of its inception, seven teachers were assigned to teach. The first principal was Asrokin bin Sanuji. His two sons, Azharuddin and Akmarizwan graduated from MRSM Terendak in 1994 and 1996 respectively when Mr. Asrokin was the principal at MRSM Jasin (now MRSM Tun Ghafar Baba), Malacca.

MRSM Terendak had its Silver Jubilee Celebration in 2008.

Inauguration

MRSM Terendak was inaugurated in 1993 by the Honourable Tun Ghafar Baba, who was then the Deputy Prime Minister of Malaysia.

Campus

MSRM Terendak at its inception was made up of a big rectangle building which is known as the Academic Building that consists of 18 classrooms, a Teacher Work Room ( (BKG)), an Education Resource Centre (library) ( (PSP)), science labs, a gymnasium, and other rooms. At the centre of the Academic Building is a large hall named  that can accommodate 700 people at one time.

The establishment of the student hostels was made in phases throughout the years with blocks A to G. Initially, the boys were placed in block A, while the girls were placed in block B. The student dining hall was next to a lake (now reduced to a proper drain) but the building is now used as a seminar room. The current student dining hall is adjacent to block E, and it is called  or Lotus Terrace. The PSP was used as a Prayer Hall before the current Musolla was built at the centre of the hostel area. There are several family houses for the teachers who are assigned as wardens.

Homerooms
MRSM Terendak homerooms are named according to the stars and  constellations which are:

 Andromeda
 Betelgeuse
 Cassiopeia (mistakenly addressed as Cassiopeta)
 Draco
 Eridanus
 Phoenix

Traditions

Sport houses

The students are divided into four sport houses. They are named after the Sultans of the Malacca Sultanate with designated colours:

 Muzaffar, named after Sultan Muzaffar Shah (red)
 Mansur, named after Sultan Mansur Shah (yellow)
 Alauddin, named after Sultan Alauddin Riayat Shah (green)
 Mahmud, named after Sultan Mahmud Shah (blue)

The winning house gets the Annual Championship Trophy while the athletes will be given their respective medals including trophies for Best Athletes for male and female categories.

Notable alumni 
The alumni association of MRSM Terendak is known as  Persatuan Bekas Pelajar MRSM Terendak (ANSARA Terendak).

 Datuk Seri Razali Ibrahim (Politician, Ex-Minister)
 Datin Dr. Halina Yunos (Medical Doctor, Wife of the first Malaysian Astronaut - Sheikh Muszaphar Shukor)
IR. Dr. Nadiahnor Md Yusop (Associate Professor UiTM)
 Captain Mushafiz Mustafa Bakri (CEO - Malindo Air)

References
https://www.thestar.com.my/business/business-news/2019/08/26/malindo-appoints-mushafiz-mustafa-bakri-as-ceo

External links
 

Educational institutions established in 1983
1983 establishments in Malaysia